Donald Mackenzie Smeaton  (9 September 1848 – 19 April 1910) was a Scottish politician who was the Liberal MP for Stirlingshire from January 1906 until January 1910.

Life
Born the son of David James Smeaton, Donald was educated at the Abbey Park Institution, St. Andrew's, a boarding school run by his father, at which not less than 80 young men were boarded and educated. He then attended the University of St Andrews, where he graduated with an M.A. degree. Arriving in India in 1867, Smeaton held minor appointments in the North-Western Provinces.

On 5 September 1873, Smeaton married Annette Louisa Lushington, daughter of Sir Henry Lushington (1826-1898), 4th Bt. and Elizabeth Cheape.

In 1879, he went to Burma, where he served as Chief Secretary in 1887, officiated as Chief Commissioner in 1892 and 1896 and was a Member of the Governor-General's Legislative Council of Burma in 1898 and 1901. He was made Companion of the Order of the Star of India in 1895, was awarded the Kaisar-i-Hind Medal in 1900 and retired in 1902. Smeaton published editions of the North-Western Provinces Revenue Act, The Currency of India and The Karens of Burma.

Death
He died in April 1910 aged 61, three months after retiring from Parliament.

References

External links 
 
Photo of Smeaton Family at St. Andrews, c.1860
Read The Karens of Burma at Project Gutenberg Australia

1848 births
1910 deaths
Companions of the Order of the Star of India
Members of the Parliament of the United Kingdom for Scottish constituencies
Members of the Legislative Council of Burma
Administrators in British Burma
UK MPs 1906–1910
Scottish Liberal Party MPs
Alumni of the University of St Andrews
Members of the Parliament of the United Kingdom for Stirling constituencies
Recipients of the Kaisar-i-Hind Medal